A bite is a wound received from the mouth of an animal or human; it is also a verb describing that action.

Bite or BITE may also refer to:

Related to biting
 Biting, the process of chewing or mastication, whereby food is crushed and ground by teeth
 Occlusion (dentistry), called "bite" (e.g., as in "overbite" or "underbite"), the contact between teeth

Arts, entertainment, and media

Music
 Bite (album), a 1983 album by Altered Images
 Bites (album), a 1985 album by Skinny Puppy
 Bite, a 1990 album by Ned's Atomic Dustbin

Stage productions
 Bite (show), a topless vampire show at the Stratosphere Las Vegas in Las Vegas, Nevada, United States
 BITE, an acronym for Barbican International Theatre Events at the Barbican Centre, London

Other arts, entertainment, and media
 Bite (film), a 2015 horror film
 BiteTV, a Canadian television channel
 The Beast in the East, a professional wrestling event produced by WWE

Science and technology
 BiTE, an acronym for bi-specific T-cell engagers, a class of specific modified antibodies
 BITE Model (Behavior, Information, Thought, and Emotional control), a model to describe control methods used by cults
 Built-in test equipment, or BITE, a concept in aviation

Other uses
 The Bite, or the Adelaide Bite, a baseball team now known as the Adelaide Giants
 Bitė Group, a Lithuanian telecommunication company

See also

 
 
 
 Bight (disambiguation)
 Bit (disambiguation)
 Bitten (disambiguation)
 Byte (disambiguation)